Stephen Whitfield "Steve" Dils (born December 8, 1955) is an American retired football quarterback who played 10 seasons in the National Football League.

College career
Dils played high school football at Fort Vancouver High School in Vancouver, Washington, and attended Stanford University. He was Stanford's starting quarterback under Bill Walsh in 1978, and led Stanford to a 25-22 victory over Georgia in the 1978 Bluebonnet Bowl, where he was named the game's offensive most valuable player. That season, Dils won the Sammy Baugh Trophy, awarded to the top passer in college football.

College statistics

* Includes bowl games.

NFL career
Dils was drafted by the Minnesota Vikings in the fourth round of the 1979 NFL Draft. In his second year with the club, he made his first start filling in for an injured Tommy Kramer and led the Vikings to a win over the Washington Redskins, a game which proved crucial to Minnesota's playoff run that year. He played six seasons with the Vikings and started most of the 1983 season, where he was paired in the backfield with former Stanford teammate Darrin Nelson. He was traded to the Los Angeles Rams in 1984. He spent his final full season with the Atlanta Falcons before retiring with the Rams before the 1989 regular season began. 

Chris Berman bestowed one of his more labored nicknames -- Steve "Love the One You're With" Dils -- based on the player's vague similarity in name to Stephen Stills.

After football
Dils is currently the managing director of the Canadian commercial real estate company Avison Young's Atlanta office.

See also
 List of NCAA major college football yearly passing leaders

References

Minnesota Vikings players
Los Angeles Rams players
Atlanta Falcons players
1955 births
Living people
American football quarterbacks
Stanford Cardinal football players
Sportspeople from Vancouver, Washington
National Football League replacement players
Players of American football from Seattle